Suzanne ("Suzie") Margaret Faulkner (born 16 March 1979 in Brisbane, Queensland) is a field hockey striker from Australia, who made her debut for the Australian women's national team in 2002 during a Six Nations International Tournament. Nicknamed Wongy she was a member of the Hockeyroos at the 2004 Summer Olympics in Athens, Greece, where the team ended up in fifth place in the overall-rankings.

References

Hockey Australia Profile
 sports-reference

External links
 

1979 births
Living people
Australian female field hockey players
Olympic field hockey players of Australia
Field hockey players at the 2004 Summer Olympics
Field hockey players at the 2006 Commonwealth Games
Sportswomen from Queensland
Commonwealth Games gold medallists for Australia
Sportspeople from Brisbane
Commonwealth Games medallists in field hockey
20th-century Australian women
21st-century Australian women
Medallists at the 2006 Commonwealth Games